Frederick the Great Playing the Flute at Sanssouci or The Flute Concert is an 1852 oil on canvas history painting by the German painter Adolph Menzel. It depicts Frederick the Great, King of Prussia playing the flute at an evening concert at Sanssouci and is now in the Alte Nationalgalerie in Berlin.

Menzel was one of the most popular and important Realist painters of the 19th century, and was ennobled as Adolph von Menzel in 1898. His works form an important record of life in Prussia at the time, especially the life of Frederick the Great. Sanssouci (meaning Free of Care), was Frederick's summer palace at Potsdam, near Berlin.  

The painting depicts a musical soirée at the palace at which a piece of music is being played with King Frederick himself playing the flute center stage. In front of him sits his chamber ensemble and to his rear an audience of dignitaries and noble ladies. The focus of the work is not on the music but rather on Frederick and the ambience created by the interior design, the furniture, the chandelier and candlelight and the ladies' elaborate dresses. 

The assembly is made up of some of the leading names of the day, namely:

 Johann Joachim Quantz, the king's flute teacher (standing far right)
 Franz Benda, Bohemian violinist and composer (on his right with a violin and a dark skirt)
 Carl Philipp Emanuel Bach, German musician and composer (harpsichord player)
 Gustav Adolf von Gotter, diplomat (foreground at left)
 Jakob Friedrich von Bielfeld, German writer and statesman (behind him)
 Pierre Louis Maupertuis, French mathematician and philosopher (behind him, looking up)
 Wilhelmine von Bayreuth, Frederick's sister (sitting on the pink couch)
 Amalie von Preussen, composer and also Frederick's sister (on her right, with a court lady)
 Carl Heinrich Graun, German composer and the court conductor (behind them)
 Countess Camas (elderly lady behind the music stand)
 Egmont von Chasot, friend of Frederick (behind her)

See also
 100 Great Paintings, 1980 BBC series

References

Paintings by Adolph Menzel
Paintings in the collection of the Alte Nationalgalerie
1852 paintings
History paintings
Cultural depictions of Frederick the Great
Musical instruments in art